Korrapati Ranganatha Sai, better known as Sai Korrapati, is an Indian film producer and distributor who works predominantly in Telugu cinema .

Early life and career
He is born in Guntur. He ventured into Telugu film distribution in 1999 with Seetaramaraju. He owns a theatre Radhika in his home town Bellary. He distributed blockbuster movies in Telugu film for over fifty feature films. He ventured into film production with Lahiri Lahiri Lahirilo. He is an angel investor in Sillymonks, PGO, Nalgonda Eagles in Telangana Premier Kabaddi.
In 2012, he founded the film production company Vaaraahi Chalana Chitram.

Film production

Film distribution

Awards
National Film Award for Best Feature Film in Telugu- Eega (2012)
Filmfare Best Film Award (Telugu) - Eega (2012)
SIIMA Award for Best Film (Telugu) - Eega (2012)

References

Telugu film producers
1968 births
Living people
Indian film producers
Film producers from Andhra Pradesh
People from Guntur district